Warrenton may refer to the following places:

South Africa
 Warrenton, Northern Cape, a town

United States
 Warrenton, Georgia, a city
 Warrenton, Indiana, an extinct town
 Warrenton, Gibson County, Indiana, an unincorporated town
 Warrenton, Mississippi, an unincorporated community
 Warrenton, Missouri, a city
 Warrenton High School (Missouri), a school located in Warrenton, Missouri
 Warrenton, North Carolina, a town
 Warrenton, Ohio, an unincorporated community
 Warrenton, Oregon, a city
 Warrenton, Texas, an unincorporated community
 Warrenton, Virginia, a town
 Warrenton Training Center, a Central Intelligence Agency communications facility